Alex Nesovic (born 10 November 1972) is an English former footballer who played as a striker for Queen of the South, Albion Rovers, Partick Thistle, Scarborough and Ayr United.

References
Post War English & Scottish Football League A - Z Player's Transfer Database profile

1974 births
Living people
English footballers
League of Ireland players
Bohemian F.C. players
Shelbourne F.C. players
Dundalk F.C. players
Derry City F.C. players
Finn Harps F.C. players
Dublin City F.C. players
Footballers from Bradford
Queen of the South F.C. players
Albion Rovers F.C. players
Partick Thistle F.C. players
Harrogate Town A.F.C. players
Eccleshill United F.C. players
Barrow A.F.C. players
Guiseley A.F.C. players
Scarborough F.C. players
Ayr United F.C. players
Bradford (Park Avenue) A.F.C. players
Scottish Football League players
Association football forwards
Expatriate association footballers in the Republic of Ireland